Poems, in Two Volumes is a collection of poetry by English Romantic poet William Wordsworth, published in 1807.

It contains many notable poems, including:

 "Resolution and Independence"
 "I Wandered Lonely as a Cloud" (sometimes anthologized as "The Daffodils")
 "My Heart Leaps Up"
 "Ode: Intimations of Immortality"
 "Ode to Duty"
 "The Solitary Reaper"
 "Elegiac Stanzas"
 "Composed upon Westminster Bridge, September 3, 1802"
 "London, 1802"
 "The World Is Too Much with Us"

Contents
The contents of Volume I and Volume II:

Volume I
To the Daisy
Louisa
Fidelity
She was a Phantom of delight
The Redbreast and the Butterfly
The Sailor's Mother
To the Small Celandine
To the same Flower
Character of the Happy Warrior
The Horn of Egremont Castle
The Affliction of Margaret —— of ——
The Kitten and the falling Leaves
The Seven Sisters, or the Solitude of Binnorie
To H.C., six Years old
Among all lovely things my Love had been
I travell'd among unknown Men
Ode to Duty

POEMS, COMPOSED DURING A TOUR, CHIEFLY ON FOOT.
1. Beggars
2. To a Sky-Lark
3. With how sad Steps, O Moon, thou climb'st the Sky
4. Alice Fell
5. Resolution and Independence

SONNETS
Prefatory Sonnet

PART THE FIRST—MISCELLANEOUS SONNETS.
1.
2.
3. Composed after a Journey across the Hamilton Hills, Yorkshire
4.
5. To Sleep
6. To Sleep
7. To Sleep
8.
9. To the River Duddon
10. From the Italian of Michael Angelo
11. From the same
12. From the same. To the Supreme Being
13. Written in very early Youth
14. Composed upon Westminster Bridge, Sept. 3, 1803
15.
16.
17. To ——
18.
19.
20. To the Memory of Raisley Calvert

PART THE SECOND—SONNETS DEDICATED TO LIBERTY.
CONTENTS.
1. Composed by the Sea-side, near Calais, August, 1802
2. Is it a Reed
3. To a Friend, composed near Calais, on the Road leading to Ardres, August 7, 1802
4.
5.
6. On the Extinction of the Venetian Republic
7. The King of Sweden
8. To Toussaint L'Ouverture
9.
10. Composed in the Valley near Dover, on the Day of Landing
11.
12. Thought of a Briton on the Subjugation of Switzerland
13. Written in London, September, 1802
14.
15.
16.
17.
18.
19.
20.
21.
22.
23. To the Men of Kent. October, 1803
24.
25. Anticipation. October, 1803
26.

Volume II

POEMS WRITTEN DURING A TOUR IN SCOTLAND.
1. Rob Roy's Grave
2. The solitary Reaper
3. Stepping Westward
4. Glen-Almain, or the Narrow Glen
5. The Matron of Jedborough and her Husband
6. To a Highland Girl
7. Sonnet
8. Address to the Sons of Burns after visiting their Father's Grave, Aug. 14th, 1803
9. Yarrow unvisited

MOODS OF MY OWN MIND.
1. To a Butterfly
2.
3.
4.
5. Written in March while resting on the Bridge at the Foot of Brother's Water
6. The small Celandine
7.
8.
9. The Sparrow's Nest
10. Gipsies
11. To the Cuckoo
12. To a Butterfly
13.

THE BLIND HIGHLAND BOY.
The Blind Highland Boy
The Green Linnet
To a Young Lady, who had been reproached for taking long Walks in the Country
By their floating Mill, &c
Star-gazers
Power of Music
To the Daisy
To the same Flower
Incident, characteristic of a favourite Dog,
which belonged to a Friend of the Author
Tribute to the Memory of the same Dog
Sonnet
Sonnet
Sonnet
Sonnet to Thomas Clarkson
Once in a lonely Hamlet, &c
Foresight, or the Charge of a Child to his younger Companion
A Complaint
I am not One, &c
Yes! full surely 'twas the Echo, &c
To the Spade of a Friend
Song, at the Feast of Brougham Castle
Lines, composed at Grasmere
Elegiac Stanzas
Ode
Notes

Critical reception
Poems in Two Volumes has been considered to be the peak of Wordsworth's power, and of his popularity. However, it was poorly reviewed by Wordsworth's contemporaries, including Lord Byron, whom Wordsworth would come to despise. Byron said of the volume, in one of its first reviews, "Mr. W[ordsworth] ceases to please, ... clothing [his ideas] in language not simple, but puerile". Wordsworth himself wrote ahead to soften the thoughts of The Critical Review, hoping his friend Wrangham would push a softer approach. He succeeded in preventing a known enemy from writing the review, but it didn't help; as Wordsworth himself said, it was a case of "Out of the frying pan, into the fire". Of any positives within Poems in Two Volumes, perceived masculinity in "The Happy Warrior" was one. "I Wandered Lonely as a Cloud" couldn't have been further from it. Wordsworth took the reviews stoically.

References

Works by William Wordsworth